Ningombam (also, Ningomba or Ningom) is a surname which is used by a large number of Meiteis. It is a clan belonging to the Angom dynasty, one of the seven ruling dynasties in the historic state of Manipur Kingdom. Ningombam being a royal scion had the traditions of marrying the princesses of the other royal families of Manipur.

The term "Ningombam" got transformed from "Ningomba" due to the introduction of "m" as a suffix in every Meitei surname in the era of Hinduism being spread in Manipur, a couple of centuries ago. From the Cheitharol Kumbaba - the Meitei state chronicle, it is discovered that King Khui Ningomba ruled the then kingdom of Manipur from 363 to 378 A.D.

Notable people with this family name are:
 Biju Ningombam (actress), Indian actress
 Khui Ningomba (363 A.D. - 378 A.D.), King of Angom dynasty
 Ningombam Bupenda Meitei, Indian writer
 Ningomba Engson Singh, Indian footballer

Ethnic groups in India
Indian surnames
Meitei people